Fortune Is a Woman is a 1952 thriller novel by the British writer Winston Graham. An insurance investigator investigates a fire at a manor house, and becomes involved with a married woman who might be guilty of fraud.

Film adaptation
In 1957 it was turned into film of the same title directed by Sidney Gilliat and starring Jack Hawkins, Arlene Dahl and Dennis Price.

References

Bibliography
 Goble, Alan. The Complete Index to Literary Sources in Film. Walter de Gruyter, 1999.
 Woods, Tim. Who's Who of Twentieth Century Novelists. Routledge, 2008.

1952 British novels
Novels by Winston Graham
British thriller novels
British novels adapted into films
Novels set in London
Hodder & Stoughton books